Task Force Anti Illicit Immigration (TAFII) is a task force deployed by the Sri Lanka Army from 1963 from 1981 to counter illegal immigration from South India. It was the first field formation deployed by the Ceylon Army and had its headquarters at Palaly.

TAFII originated from "Operations Monty" named after then Parliamentary Secretary to the Minister of External Affairs and Defense, Major Montague Jayawickrama in 1952 to stop illegal immigration of Indian Tamils repatriated to India after they were refused citizenship by the government of Ceylon. In 1963, operation was renamed as Task Force Anti Illicit Immigration as a formation in support of Royal Ceylon Navy coastal patrols and police operations. Initially army contribution was known as "Army Force M" consisted of an infantry  battalion with support units based in the coast of Mannar. The task force had its headquarters at Palaly and had units deployed from Mollikulam point to Kokilai. There were army camps in Silavathurai, Thalladi, Talaimannar, Pooneryn, Valvettithurai, Madagala, Thondamannar, Mulleitivu and Kokilai. In addition several smaller detachments of 5-10 soldiers each were located. After 1972, TAFII shifted its focus to counter insurgency operations with the raise of the Tamil militancy. It was disbanded in 1980 with the on set of the Sri Lankan Civil War and was replaced by the Task Force 4 Northern Command.

Past Commanding officers, Ops Monty
Maj. General H. W. G. Wijeyekoon

Past Commanders TAFII
 Colonel Sepala Attygalle 1963-1965 
 Colonel M P Jayaweera 	1965-1966
 Colonel P. D. Ramayanayake	1969-1970
 Colonel E. T. De Z Abeysekera	1970-1971
 Colonel B. K. V. J. E. Rodrigo  	1971-1972
 Colonel Tissa Weeratunga	1972-1976
 Colonel Henry Athukorale	1976-1977
 Colonel M Medawala	1977-1977
 Colonel G D Fernando	1977-1978

Notable Members
General Nalin Seneviratne - former staff officer, TAFII
Lt. General Denzil Kobbekaduwa - former staff officer, TAFII
Lt. Colonel Gotabaya Rajapaksa - former signals officer, TAFII 
Brigadier M. H. Gunaratne - Officer Commanding Troops, TAFII 
Major General D.W. Hapuarachchi - Officer Commanding Troops, TAFII 
Lt. Colonel Bertie Dias - Officer Commanding Troops, TAFII

References

Fromer commands of the Sri Lanka Army
Military units and formations of the Sri Lanka Army
Illegal immigration
India–Sri Lanka relations
Indian emigrants to Sri Lanka
Indian Tamils of Sri Lanka